David Welch (born February 16, 1940) is an American politician in the state of New Hampshire. He is a member of the New Hampshire House of Representatives, sitting as a Republican from the Rockingham 13 district, having been first elected in 2010. He previously served from 1984 to 2012.

References

Living people
1940 births
Republican Party members of the New Hampshire House of Representatives
21st-century American politicians